Hamad Mansour (Arabic:حمد منصور) (born 13 August 1994) is a Qatari footballer plays for Al-Kharaitiyat as a midfielder.

External links

References

Qatari footballers
1994 births
Living people
Al Sadd SC players
Muaither SC players
Al-Khor SC players
Qatar SC players
Al Kharaitiyat SC players
Qatar Stars League players
Qatari Second Division players
Association football midfielders